Walcot may refer to:

Places 
 Walcot, Bath, a suburb of the city of Bath, England
 Walcot, Lincolnshire, near Folkingham, Lincolnshire, England
 Walcot, North Lincolnshire, a hamlet in the civil parish of Alkborough, Lincolnshire, England
 Walcot, Oxfordshire, a hamlet in Oxfordshire near Charlbury
 Walcot, Shropshire, a village in the borough of Telford and Wrekin, Shropshire, England
 Walcot, Swindon, a suburb

Derived names
 Walcot Hall, Southorpe, now in Peterborough, England
 Walcot Hall, a Georgian country house near Alkborough, North Lincolnshire
 Walcot Hall, a Georgian country house in Lydbury North parish, Shropshire, England

People
 Thomas Walcot (1629–1685), British judge and politician
 Thomas Walcot (Lieut Colonel) (1625-1683), British soldier
 William Walcot (1874–1943), British architect, graphic artist and etcher

See also 
 Walcott, Lincolnshire
 Walcote (disambiguation)
 Walcott (disambiguation)
 Woolcott (disambiguation)